Leishangthem Susindro Meitei is an Indian politician and member of the Bharatiya Janata Party. He is a member of the Manipur Legislative Assembly, representing the Khurai constituency. On 16 April of 2022, he had sworn himself as the Minister of Public Health Engineering Department, Consumer Affairs, Food & Public Distribution Department in the Second N. Biren Singh ministry. He was widely criticised for his false promises made during the campaign of 2022 election. He promised that 10000 children would be given iPad and 1GB data per day if he became MLA.

References

Manipur MLAs 2017–2022
Year of birth missing (living people)
Bharatiya Janata Party politicians from Manipur
Living people
Manipur MLAs 2022–2027
People from Imphal East district